Desert Hearts is a 1985 American romantic drama film directed by Donna Deitch.  The screenplay, written by Natalie Cooper, is an adaptation of the 1964 lesbian novel Desert of the Heart by Jane Rule. Set in Reno, Nevada in 1959, it tells the story of a university professor awaiting a divorce who finds her true self through a relationship with another, more self-confident woman. The film stars Helen Shaver and Patricia Charbonneau with a supporting performance by Audra Lindley.

Desert Hearts was released theatrically in the United States on March 7, 1986 and in the United Kingdom on June 6, 1986. It is regarded as one of the first wide release films to present a positive portrayal of lesbian sexuality.

Plot
In 1959, Vivian Bell, a 35-year-old English professor at Columbia University in New York City, travels to Reno to establish residency in Nevada (a process that takes six weeks), in order to obtain a quick divorce. She stays at a guest house ranch for women who are waiting for their divorces to be finalized. The ranch is owned by Frances Parker.

Soon after her arrival in Reno, Vivian meets Cay Rivers, a young, free-spirited sculptor. Frances was the longtime mistress of Cay's late father, Glenn, and raised Cay after her biological mother (Glenn's wife) abandoned her. Cay is employed as a change operator at a casino in Reno, and is ending a relationship with Darrell, her controlling boss, saying that she was "attracted to his attraction" to her. When Vivian arrives, Cay takes an immediate interest in her; the proper, elegant Vivian is taken aback by Cay's lack of concern for what others think of her, as Cay has had relationships with women in the past. Frances, dismayed by Cay's lesbianism but frightened by the possibility of Cay leaving her alone, becomes resentful as Cay and Vivian grow closer.

After they attend an engagement party for Silver, Cay's best friend and co-worker, Cay takes a mildly inebriated Vivian to see Pyramid Lake at twilight and kisses her. Vivian returns the kiss passionately, but then becomes apprehensive and asks Cay to take her home. When they return to the ranch early the next morning, Frances angrily kicks Vivian out and accuses her of seducing Cay. Deeply hurt, Cay leaves the ranch immediately as Vivian transfers to a hotel near the casino for the rest of her stay.

Later, Cay arrives at Vivian's hotel room, where they initially clash but ultimately consummate their love after Cay removes her clothes and invites Vivian to bed. With the impending finalization of Vivian's divorce, the two struggle with the future of their relationship. At Silver's wedding, Cay attempts to reconcile with Frances, stating that Vivian "just reached in and put a string of lights around my heart," directly quoting Frances's own description of how she fell in love with Glenn.

After Vivian's divorce has become finalized, she packs up and boards a train to return to New York City. Cay still refuses to commit to leaving Nevada, but boards the train at the last minute as it begins to move away, agreeing to accompany Vivian until they reach the next station.

Cast

Development and production
Desert Hearts is loosely based on the 1964 romance novel Desert of the Heart by Jane Rule. In 1979, Donna Deitch was searching for a story about a lesbian romance that "was mainstream, not in the context of the women's community or (New York's) the Village." The first draft of the screenplay, written by Deitch, followed the original story, but when Natalie Cooper was hired as the screenwriter she veered away from it. The names of the main characters were changed: Evelyn Hall became Vivian Bell and Ann Childs became Cay Rivers. Other characters were minimized or excluded, subplots were eliminated, and the love scene was made explicit. Jane Rule described the film as "beautifully simplified".

Deitch raised the $1.5 million needed for the production budget with a $20,000 grant from the National Endowment for the Arts and sales of $15,000 shares to stock brokers and individual investors. The largest group of investors were lesbian and feminist women in several cities of the U.S., and the largest single investor was a gay man. She gave fundraising parties and published a regular newsletter to keep investors informed about the project's development. Raising funds took almost four years. She eventually sold her house to cover completion costs. In a 1991 interview with The Guardian, Deitch said that: "In San Francisco I sold it as politics. In New York as Art. In LA I convinced them it would be a box office hit." It took nearly six years for Deitch to bring Desert Hearts to theater screens.

Deitch encountered difficulty finding actresses who would portray lesbians without reserve with many refusing to audition for the film. Patricia Charbonneau was the first actress to be cast and went to Los Angeles with Deitch so she could audition with those reading for the role of Vivian Bell. Deitch noticed the chemistry between Charbonneau and Helen Shaver immediately. She persuaded actors to work for scale, and after casting completed, the film was shot on location in Reno in 31 days. Limited funds often necessitated filming two scenes in one day, with little room for retakes. Renting space in a real casino was out of the question and a dressed set in a room of an abandoned hotel served as the gambling casino in the film.

Desert Hearts was Patricia Charbonneau's film debut. The contract with Charbonneau and Shaver obligated them to perform the sex scene in the hotel room without body doubles and to be nude on camera from the waist up. The scene was shot on the second-to-last day of filming, with cinematographer Robert Elswit and a boom operator as the only crew members present. The Samuel Goldwyn Company insisted in having the scene cut down but Deitch refused. In a 1986 Los Angeles Times interview, Helen Shaver described it as being "profoundly intimate".

Deitch became the first lesbian director to have a sex scene between women seen by general movie theater audiences. She was surprised to learn 20 years after the film's release that Helen Shaver and Patricia Charbonneau were told by their friends and agents that the film would ruin their careers.

In a 1986 Globe and Mail interview, Shaver said that she was being considered for a role in Joshua Then and Now, which would have promoted her career much farther than Desert Hearts. Donna Deitch assured her over the phone that she was right for her movie and told her she refused to hang up the phone until she got an answer. After five minutes, Shaver accepted the role. Shaver explained her feelings about the film. "I was scared, not about the lesbianism — the script said, 'The passion builds' in the love scene, so once I knew how the passion built and where the camera would be, that was fine — but because someone wanted me to do what I'd wanted to do all along, and here it was, and all I had to do was say yes. I had always wanted to carry a movie. Now, if I never make another one, I've done this. For the first time, I feel I've done a complete work on film."

An original 35 mm print of Desert Hearts was donated to the Outfest UCLA Legacy Project for LGBT Film Preservation at the UCLA Film & Television Archive. In celebration of its 30th anniversary, Deitch's personal 35 mm print was screened at The Museum of Modern Art in December 2016.

Desert Hearts was digitally restored by the UCLA Film & Television Archive and the Criterion Collection/Janus Films in conjunction with the Outfest UCLA Legacy Project and the Sundance Institute.

In April 2016, Donna Deitch announced that she was fundraising to produce a sequel to Desert Hearts, to be set in New York City during the women's liberation movement.

Release

Desert Hearts made its North American debut at the 1985 Telluride Film Festival in September 1985. It had its world premiere at the 1985 Toronto International Film Festival in September 1985. The film screened at the 1985 Chicago International Film Festival on November 15, 1985, and the 1986 Sundance Film Festival in January 1986.  Desert Hearts was the only lesbian film out of nine films selected for screening at the first London Lesbian and Gay Film Festival in 1986.

It was wide released in the U.S. by The Samuel Goldwyn Company on March 7, 1986, and in the U.K. by Mainline Pictures Ltd. on June 6, 1986.

The 4K restoration made its debut at the 2017 Sundance Film Festival on January 24, 2017 (followed by a Q&A with director Donna Deitch, cinematographer Robert Elswit, and production designer Jeannine Oppewall). It was screened in Los Angeles by the UCLA Film & Television Archive on February 4, 2017; and in San Francisco at the Frameline Film Festival on June 18, 2017. The new digital version was released in theaters by Janus Films in July 2017.

Critical reception 
The reaction by film critics was mixed. In his scathing review for The New York Times, Vincent Canby criticized the screenplay as "unimaginative", described its characters as having "so little life", and the film as lacking a "voice or style of its own", but did add that it "is so earnest and sincere that it deserves an A for deportment". In comparison, Gene Siskel of the Chicago Tribune gave the film 3-1/2 stars out of 4 and wrote that it was "elegant, traditional story-telling" with "complete characterizations and performances, a genuinely tender and erotic love scene and a sweetly satisfying finale"; adding "the filmmaking and performances are so seamless that "Desert Hearts" may accomplish on film what hasn't been achieved in society—the de-sensationalizing of lesbianism."

In the review for The Body Politic, Ed Jackson said the screenplay was "spiked with hilarious one-liners", described the love scene as "a luminous study in gentle eroticism, almost painfully intimate", and the film as "a treat that is both soft-centred and sugar-coated", "handsome, well-constructed", and "much more dense than the simple propaganda that it might at first resemble." Michael Musto wrote in the Saturday Review that "Lesbianism isn't exploited for angst a la Children's Hour, or touched upon then summarily dropped as in Personal Best; it's handled tenderly and optimistically, if not with a lot of levity and wit." Paul Attanasio of The Washington Post praised the film highly, calling it "astonishingly polished and nuanced"; and although some aspects of the cinematography were criticized, remarked "Donna Deitch's first feature, touches something about love that few movies even hint at — not the tremulousness, or the hiding and jousting (although there is that), but the way the attraction of two lovers warps the world around them, throws it out of whack." In the Los Angeles Times, Sheila Benson wrote that although it was not "easy to sympathize with her character", Charbonneau was a  "magnetic presence" and both she and Audra Lindley gave "crackerjack performances"; stating "although you can feel the budget limitations with every truncated scene, it's clear that Deitch is adept with actors and with the camera". In the Chicago Sun-Times, Roger Ebert  gave Desert Hearts two and a half stars for the simplicity and directness of the film, but noted the surprising power of the romantic scenes. In City Limits, Amanda Lipman wrote that it was "a passionate, lovingly shot romance" and that "one of the most important differences between [Desert Hearts] and most heterosexual romances is the equality with which it treats each of its central characters." Geoff Brown in  The Times praised the film wholeheartedly, including both actors in the leading roles, writing "Fuelled by vibrant performances and an expert script that articulates feelings without ascending into wordy clouds, Desert Hearts rises far above such pigeon-hole categories as the nostalgic period drama or the lesbian love-story. Deitch's film is a passionate, beautifully controlled drama about making choices and exercising the heart: in a word, about living."

In his critical study about homosexuality in the movies, The Celluloid Closet: Homosexuality in the Movies, film historian Vito Russo wrote: "Desert Hearts is a love story that recreates with perceptiveness and tenderness what it might have been like for two women of different generations and backgrounds to fall in love in the Fifties....Deitch's refusal to feature the straight world's reaction to lesbianism as the focus of her film made all the difference in the way the relationship between the women was perceived by audiences." He remarked about Vincent Canby's review of the film: "In the New York Times, Vincent Canby complained that we are not given enough information about the quality of Vivian's broken marriage, asking if perhaps her lesbianism was a hysterical reaction to her divorce. This is the point at which many heterosexual critics disqualify themselves from perceptively reviewing gay films."

On review aggregator Rotten Tomatoes, Desert Hearts has a 90% approval rating based on 29 reviews, with an average score of 7.5 out of 10.  On Metacritic, the film holds a score of 67 out of 100, based on 12 film critic reviews, indicating "generally favorable reviews".

Reevaluation
With the passage of time, Desert Hearts has gained recognition for its quality and impact on lesbian cinema. In 1996, The Sydney Morning Herald declared, "Donna Deitch's 1985 Desert Hearts is widely regarded as one of the best and most significant mainstream fiction films about lesbians." The Globe and Mail referred to it as "one of the first and most highly regarded works in which a lesbian relationship is depicted favourably."

The Lesbian Film Guide states: "It is no exaggeration to say that in 1985 Desert Hearts was the film many lesbians had waited for all their lives. For the first time in cinema history here was a movie which was an unashamedly romantic lesbian love story, aimed primarily at a lesbian audience."

PlanetOut defined it as "One of the seminal lesbian/gay films of the 1980s, and arguably the most romantic lesbian film of all time"; and "historically important because it was the first lesbian-themed feature film written and directed by a woman."  In 2002, Desert Hearts was a nominee in the American Film Institute list of greatest love stories in film in 100 years. In 2013, The Guardian named Desert Hearts one of the ten most romantic films and characterized the final scene of Vivian and Cay at the train station as "a subversive take on hollywood endings". Curve described Desert Hearts as "possibly the first feature film with fully-rounded female characters who are attracted to each other without that attraction being contested by a male."

In 2007, Outfest named Desert Hearts one of the "25 Films That Changed Our Lives".  It was one of "The 25 Most Important LGBT Films" in a 2014 IndieWire reader's poll. In 2017, Autostraddle ranked it at 25 of the best 102 lesbian movies of all time.  In 2020, The A.V. Club named Desert Hearts one of the 50 most important American independent films.

Audience reception
Lesbian literary critic Camille Paglia praised the film for its "riveting performances", having seen it 11 times in theaters. She claimed that Patricia Charbonneau's "magic" came from hormonal glow, as she had found out she was pregnant before shooting began. In her landmark work Sexual Personae (1990), Paglia wrote: "The closest thing I have ever seen to Shakespeare's Rosalind is Patricia Charbonneau's spirited performance as a coltish Reno cowgirl in Donna Deitch's film Desert Hearts."

Actress Jane Lynch said she had never "seen in celluloid such real passion and desire between two women" and had watched the video "over 50 times". C.J. Prince, author and executive director of North Jersey Pride, wrote in 2014 that Desert Hearts "was refreshingly different, not only because the characters weren't psychotic, but also because it didn't end in depressing, unrequited love...or death", adding "the film holds up as a bold, beautifully rendered story about the search for authenticity and love, and the sacrifices one has to make to find them...For a coming-out movie, it's as good as it gets."

In an assessment of lesbian genre films since the 1980s, Slate said the film was "immensely popular with lesbian audiences" and earned "cult classic status...years after it was released".

Box office
By the fall of 1986, Desert Hearts had grossed $2.5 million in the United States and Canada. The revenue from its rental by independent distribution companies was $1.1 million.

Accolades

Home media
The VHS of Desert Hearts was released by Vestron Video in the United States in December 1986, and in the United Kingdom by Vestron Video International on April 3, 1987. The DVD was released by MGM Home Entertainment in Region 1 on January 23, 2001.

A 2-Disc "Vintage Collection" special edition DVD for Region 1 was released by Wolfe Video on June 5, 2007. The DVD's extra features included original theatrical trailer, previously unseen footage of the love scene, slide show of production photographs, a commentary by Donna Deitch and interviews she conducted with Helen Shaver and Patricia Charbonneau.

The digitally restored version was released in Blu-ray and DVD by The Criterion Collection on November 14, 2017; featuring new interviews with Helen Shaver and Patricia Charbonneau, an excerpt from a 1995 documentary about Jane Rule, an essay by film critic B. Ruby Rich, conversations between Donna Deitch and film crew plus Jane Lynch, and the audio commentary by Deitch included in the 2007 release by Wolfe Video.

Soundtrack
In the director's commentary bonus feature of the special edition DVD released by Wolfe Video, Donna Deitch said that approximately 20% of her budget went to obtaining the rights to the original music in the film. Deitch asked the Goldwyn Company to extend the rights to the music to release a soundtrack on album or compact cassette, but the studio declined.

Track listing
The music for Desert Hearts was supervised by Terri Fricon and Gay Jones.

See also
 List of feature films with lesbian characters
 List of LGBT-related films of 1985
 List of LGBT-related films by storyline
 Carol – Oscar-nominated 2015 lesbian romance film directed by Todd Haynes, also set in the 1950s

Notes

References

Further reading

 Bendix, Trish (December 4, 2016).  Classic Lesbian Film "Desert Hearts" Turns 30. GO Magazine.
 Cohen, Paige (January 15, 2013).  Who’s Afraid of Sexy Women?. Lambda Literary.
 Daley, Elizabeth (December 2, 2016).  The First Lesbian Movie With a Happy Ending Turns 30. The Advocate.
 Dirks, Tim. Best and Most Memorable Film Kisses (1985–1986). Filmsite.org. AMC.
 Dolan, Jill (January 3, 2008).  Desert Hearts Forever. The Feminist Spectator. Princeton University.
 Dry, Jude (July 20, 2017).  How Lily Tomlin and Gloria Steinem Helped Fund the Lesbian Film Classic 'Desert Hearts'. IndieWire
 Dunks, Glenn (January 21, 2016). Retro Sundance: 1986 Special Jury Prize Winner, Desert Hearts. The Film Experience.
 Ford, Nancy (June 1, 2007).  Back to the Desert. OutSmart.
 
 Levy, Emanuel (May 4, 2006).  Desert Hearts. EmanueLLevy–Cinema 24/7.
 Klemm, Michael D. (September 2007). Women in Love. Outcome (via CinemaQueer).
 Kukoff, Alexandra (December 1, 2016).  Q&A: Alumna, director Donna Deitch reflects on 1985 film 'Desert Hearts'. Daily Bruin. University of California, Los Angeles.
 Northern Nevada HOPES (October 13, 2015). Interview With Desert Hearts Director Donna Deitch. SoundCloud.
 
 Wildman, John (January 18, 2017).  Ten Burning Questions: Donna Deitch’s DESERT HEARTS. Festworks.

External links
  Desert Hearts at Donna Deitch website
  Desert Hearts at Janus Films
 
 
 
 
 
 
 Desert Hearts at Library of Congress
 
 
  Desert Hearts at UCLA Film & Television Archive
  Desert Hearts – 2007 Wolfe Video trailer at  Dailymotion
  Desert Hearts – 2017 Janus Films trailer at Vimeo
  Desert Hearts –  trailer at The Criterion Collection on YouTube
  Desert Hearts clips by Donna Deitch on Vimeo
  Donna Deitch – Desert Hearts Director (archived)
 Lewis Archibald interviews Donna Deitch and Helen Shaver (1985 sound recording) at Digital Collections,  The New York Public Library
Desert Hearts: The Thrill of It All essay by B. Ruby Rich at the Criterion Collection

1985 films
1985 independent films
1985 LGBT-related films
1985 romantic drama films
1980s American films
1980s English-language films
American independent films
American LGBT-related films
American romantic drama films
Lesbian-related films
LGBT-related romantic drama films
Films based on Canadian novels
Films set in 1959
Films set in the 1950s
Films set in Nevada
Films set in Reno, Nevada
Films shot in Nevada
Films directed by Donna Deitch
The Samuel Goldwyn Company films